Maccabi Tel Aviv is one of the largest sports clubs in Israel, and a part of the Maccabi association. Many sports clubs and teams in Tel Aviv are in association with Maccabi and compete in a variety of sports, such as football, basketball, judo, swimming, handball, and others.

Clubs

Maccabi Tel Aviv Football Club

Maccabi Tel Aviv F.C. is the titled club in Israeli football, and the most successful Israeli football club outside the country, having won the AFC Champions League twice. Its derby with city rivals Hapoel Tel Aviv is considered one of the most heated derbies in Israeli sports. Maccabi was the second Israeli club to reach the coveted group stage of the UEFA Champions League, and the only team in Israel that was never relegated from the top division in the Israeli league.

Maccabi Tel Aviv Basketball Club

Maccabi Tel Aviv B.C. is one of the most successful basketball clubs in Europe, having won the Euroleague competition six times, and been runner-up a further eight times.

Maccabi Tel Aviv Handball Club

The handball team of Maccabi Tel Aviv was founded in the 1930s, with the arrival of handball to Israel and was split initially to three different associations: Maccabi Tel Aviv North (which was one of Israel's most prominent handball team and won 3 Cups in a row, 1963–1965), Maccabi Tel Aviv and Soviet Maccabees. These associations united over the years under the name of Maccabi Tel Aviv. In the 2013–14 season Maccabi Tel Aviv won its first championship.

Maccabi Tel Aviv/Maccabiah Swim Club
Established in 1989.

Maccabi Tel Aviv Volleyball Club
Maccabi Tel Aviv is a professional volleyball club which plays at the highest levels of Israeli volleyball. During the 2009–10 season, the team made Israeli volleyball history by going undefeated, winning both the Cup and the League Championship. The team is coached by Arie Selinger, who is widely regarded as one of the greatest volleyball coaches of all time.

Notable members
Artem Dolgopyat (born 1997), Israeli artistic gymnast and Olympic champion
Dmitry Kroyter (born 1993), high jumper
Lonah Chemtai Salpeter (born 1988), Kenyan-Israeli Olympic marathon runner

External links

Football
Official
  Maccabi Tel Aviv Official Website

Unofficial
  Maccabi Fanatics

Basketball
Official
  Maccabi Tel Aviv Official Website
  Maccabi Tel Aviv EuroLeague site

Unofficial
  THE GATE

 
Sport in Tel Aviv
Multi-sport clubs in Israel